Symmetrischema ardeola is a moth in the family Gelechiidae. It was described by Edward Meyrick in 1931. It is found in Brazil.

References

Symmetrischema
Moths described in 1931